The Los Angeles Greek Film Festival (LAGFF), is a film festival held annually in Los Angeles, United States which showcases films and filmmakers from Greece, Cyprus and the rest of the world in the US. Since its inception in 2007, LAGFF has screened over 520 films and hosted and supported over 500 filmmakers. LAGFF is a 501(c)(3) organization and in 2021 it was the largest Greek Film Festival outside of Greece, with numerous films making their United States premiere in the festival.

For the 15th iteration of the festival, due to the COVID-19 pandemic LAGFF run its festival online.

Awards 

Films are the LAGFF are nominated for the Orpheus Awards in the following categories:

 Best Fiction Feature
 Best Performance
 Special Jury Award for Best Performance
 Best Director
 Best Feature Audience Award
 Best Short Film
 Short Film Audience Award 
 Best Documentary Film
 Documentary Special Jury Award
 Documentary Audience Award
 Best Animation Film
 Animation Special Jury Award
 Animation Audience Award

See also 
 List of film festivals in North and Central America
 Los Angeles
 Cinema of Greece
 San Francisco Greek Film Festival
 List of Greece-related topics

References

External links 

 

Awards established in 2007
Recurring events established in 2007
Film markets
Film festivals in Los Angeles